Newport Craft Brewing & Distilling Company - founded as Coastal Extreme Brewing Company in 1999 - is a brewery in Newport, Rhode Island. USA.  It first began brewing beer in 1999, under the Newport Storm brand name.

In 2006, Coastal Extreme Brewing Company expanded to create Newport Distilling Company, producer of Thomas Tew Rum; the only current rum producing operation in Rhode Island.

History
Coastal Extreme Brewing Company was established by four graduates of Colby College: Brent Ryan, Derek Luke, Mark Sinclair, and Will Rafferty.  Rhode Island was chosen as the location because, at the time of opening, there were no other microbreweries in the state.  Coastal Extreme Brewing company produces approximately 5000 barrels per year.

In 2007, Coastal Extreme also began producing Thomas Tew Rum, named after Rhode Island's first pirate.  Brent Ryan, President and CEO of Coastal Extreme, said that the production of rum is part of an effort to "resurrect the rum history of Newport."

In January 2011 the brewery was featured in an episode of the show Dirty Jobs with Mike Rowe in which the brewery showed in detail how they produce and package their Thomas Tew rum.

In March of 2018, Coastal Extreme Brewing rebranded under the Newport Craft Brewing & Distilling Company name. At the same time, Brendan O'Donnell joined the company's management team as Chief Executive Officer."

List of Cyclone Series beers
The Cyclone Series of beers are beers of varying types released by Coastal Extreme Brewing Company approximately every four months. Below is a list of all the Series to date. The names are in the style of the National Weather Service's naming of Tropical Storms where each letter of the alphabet is used as the first letter in each name and male and female names are alternated. Q and X are included in this series unlike the naming of the Tropical Storms. The one exception to the male and female alternation is the letter 'M' because Mark (named for a founder, Mark Sinclair) would have fallen on a female name. All names are someone either involved with the brewery or someone close to the brewers. The notable exceptions are Alyssa, Elle, Gloria, Isabel, Neo, Ophelia and Quinn.

Awards
2007 Annual Great International Beer Competition
3rd Place - Strong Beer: Other (Imperial Irish Stout)

2005 Annual Great International Beer Competition
1st Place - Amber & Dark Lager (Cyclone Series Brent)
3rd Place - Brown Ale (Cyclone Series Alyssa)
3rd Place - Porter (Bizzard Porter)

Advertising
Taglines:
"Newport Storm beers. Brewed in small batches—so every drop counts."

See also
 Beer in the United States
 Barrel-aged beer

References

External links
Newport Craft Brewing & Distilling Company Official Website
Thomas Tew Rum Official Website
Craft brewers adopt a can-do attitude - Boston Globe article about craft brewer's use of cans

Rums
Companies based in Rhode Island
Beer brewing companies based in Rhode Island
American companies established in 1999
Food and drink companies established in 1999